Peggy Puts It Over is a 1921 American silent comedy drama film directed by Gustav von Seyffertitz and starring Alice Calhoun, Edward Langford and Leslie Stowe.

Synopsis
Returning from college with a degree in civil engineering Peggy Conrow proposes to redevelop her father's ramshackle estate into a new town for the benefit of the locals, but is opposed by conservative views.

Cast
 Alice Calhoun as Peggy Conrow
 Edward Langford as Dr. David Ransome
 Leslie Stowe as Silas Tucker
 Charles Mackay as Maxfield Conrow
 Helen Lindroth as 	Aunt Agatha
Cornelius MacSunday as Constable
 Dick Lee as Rusty

References

Bibliography
 Connelly, Robert B. The Silents: Silent Feature Films, 1910-36, Volume 40, Issue 2. December Press, 1998.
 Munden, Kenneth White. The American Film Institute Catalog of Motion Pictures Produced in the United States, Part 1. University of California Press, 1997.

External links
 

1921 films
1921 comedy films
American silent feature films
American black-and-white films
Films directed by Gustav von Seyffertitz
Vitagraph Studios films
1920s English-language films
1920s American films
Silent American comedy films